MillerCoors was a beer brewing company in the United States. MillerCoors was formed in 2008 as a joint venture between SABMiller and Molson Coors to combine their brewing, marketing and sales operations in the United States. The company was acquired by Molson Coors in 2016. In 2019 it was announced that MillerCoors and Molson Coors Canada would be consolidated into a single business unit under the name Molson Coors North America.

History

Joint venture with SABMiller
MillerCoors was announced as a joint venture between SABMiller and Molson Coors in October 2007  and was approved by regulators on June 5, 2008. The venture was completed on June 30, 2008, and MillerCoors began operation on July 1, 2008.

On September 14, 2015, MillerCoors announced that it would shut down its Eden, North Carolina brewery in September 2016 due to declining corporate sales. The company has newer plants in Virginia and Georgia that will serve the Eden plant's distribution area. In May 2016, the Milwaukee Journal Sentinel reported that Pabst Brewing Company and Blue Ribbon Intermediate Holdings filed a lawsuit because Pabst wanted to continue making its beers in Eden.

Sole ownership by Molson Coors
During the merger discussions between Anheuser-Busch InBev and SABMiller in 2015, the U.S. Department of Justice (DOJ) agreed to the proposed deal only on the basis that SABMiller "spins off all its MillerCoors holdings in the U.S.—which include both Miller- and Coors-held brands—along with its Miller brands outside the U.S." The entire ownership situation was complicated: "In the United States, Coors is majority owned [58%] by MillerCoors (a subsidiary of SABMiller) and minority owned by Molson Coors, though internationally it's entirely owned by Molson Coors, and Miller is owned by SABMiller." SABMiller agreed to divest itself of the Miller brands by selling its stake in MillerCoors to Molson Coors.

On October 11, 2016, SABMiller sold its stake in MillerCoors for around US$12 billion after the company was acquired by Anheuser-Busch InBev, making Molson Coors the 100 percent owner of MillerCoors. Molson Coors also retained "the rights to all of the brands currently in the MillerCoors portfolio for the U.S. and Puerto Rico, including Redd's and import brands such as Peroni, Grolsch and Pilsner Urquell." The agreement made Molson Coors the world's third largest brewer.

2020 Molson Coors corporate restructuring
On January 1, 2020, Molson Coors Brewing Company changed its name to Molson Coors Beverage Company. This was part of a corporate restructuring that reorganized the company's four business units into Molson Coors North America and Molson Coors Europe and retired the MillerCoors corporate brand name.

Brands

See also
 Miller Brewing Company
 Coors Brewing Company
 Molson Coors Beverage Company

Notes

External links
 Miller History
 Molson Coors
 DOJ approves Anheuser-Busch InBev's $107 billion deal for SABMiller

Beer brewing companies based in Chicago
Joint ventures
Manufacturing companies based in Chicago
Food and drink companies established in 2008
SABMiller
Molson Coors Beverage Company
2008 establishments in Illinois
Food and drink companies disestablished in 2020
2020 disestablishments in Illinois
2016 mergers and acquisitions